Angelina Williams (born July 21, 1983) is a former professional basketball player who played two seasons in the WNBA.

College
At University of Illinois (2001–05) she majored in sports management and was a member of the Dean's List. She became the first Fighting Illini to play a WNBA game and finished her career as the school's fourth all-time leading scorer.

Illinois statistics
Source

Personal life
Williams is the daughter of Ricky and Darlene Harvest. In college, she was involved in student council.

References

External links
Angelina Williams WNBA Stats | Basketball-Reference.com
WNBA.com: Angelina Williams Bio

1983 births
Living people
African-American basketball players
Basketball players from Chicago
Detroit Shock players
Forwards (basketball)
Guards (basketball)
Illinois Fighting Illini women's basketball players
Phoenix Mercury draft picks
Phoenix Mercury players
21st-century African-American sportspeople
21st-century African-American women
20th-century African-American people
20th-century African-American women